The black-polled yellowthroat (Geothlypis speciosa) is a species of bird in the family Parulidae.

Distribution
It is endemic to central Mexico and the southwestern Mexican Plateau, in Guanajuato, Michoacán, and México State.

Its natural habitats are freshwater lakes and freshwater marshes.

Conservation
It is classified as Vulnerable by the IUCN, threatened by habitat loss.

Description 
The black-polled yellowthroat is 12.5-14 cm (4.9-5.5 inches) long and weighs 10–11.8 grams (0.35-0.42 ounces). The male is olive above and yellow below, with a black mask. The female is duller.

References

 https://www.hbw.com/species/black-polled-yellowthroat-geothlypis-speciosa

black-polled yellowthroat
Endemic birds of Mexico
Birds of the Trans-Mexican Volcanic Belt
Endangered biota of Mexico
Endangered fauna of North America
Natural history of Guanajuato
Natural history of Michoacán
Natural history of the State of Mexico
Natural history of the Mexican Plateau
black-polled yellowthroat
black-polled yellowthroat
Taxonomy articles created by Polbot